Santa Mustiola is a village (curazia) in the middle of San Marino. It belongs to the municipality of San Marino. Its name derives from a Catholic saint, Mustiola, cousin of the Roman Emperor Claudius II.

Geography
The village is situated under the Mount Titano and few km in west of the city of San Marino.

Sport
Santa Mustiola had a local football club, the Aurora, active from 1968 to 1987.

See also
San Marino (city)
Cà Berlone
Canepa
Casole
Castellaro
Montalbo
Murata

Curazie in San Marino
Geography of the City of San Marino